Curvelets are a non-adaptive technique for multi-scale object representation. Being an extension of the wavelet concept, they are becoming popular in similar fields, namely in image processing and scientific computing.

Wavelets generalize the Fourier transform by using a basis that represents both location and spatial frequency. For 2D or 3D signals, directional wavelet transforms go further, by using basis functions that are also localized in orientation. A curvelet transform differs from other directional wavelet transforms in that the degree of localisation in orientation varies with scale.

Curvelets are an appropriate basis for representing images (or other functions) which are smooth apart from singularities along smooth curves, where the curves have bounded curvature, i.e. where objects in the image have a minimum length scale. This property holds for cartoons, geometrical diagrams, and text. As one zooms in on such images, the edges they contain appear increasingly straight. Curvelets take advantage of this property, by defining the higher resolution curvelets to be more elongated than the lower resolution curvelets. However, natural images (photographs) do not have this property; they have detail at every scale. Therefore, for natural images, it is preferable to use some sort of directional wavelet transform whose wavelets have the same aspect ratio at every scale.

When the image is of the right type, curvelets provide a representation that is considerably sparser than other wavelet transforms. The extra assumption underlying the curvelet transform allows it to achieve .

Efficient numerical algorithms exist for computing the curvelet transform of discrete data. The computational cost of the discrete curvelet transforms proposed by Candès et al.

Curvelet construction 
To construct a basic curvelet  and provide a tiling of the 2-D frequency space, two main ideas should be followed:
 Consider polar coordinates in frequency domain
 Construct curvelet elements being locally supported near wedges

The number of wedges is  
at the scale , i.e., it doubles in each second circular ring.

Let 
be the variable in frequency domain, and  be the polar coordinates in the frequency domain.

We use the ansatz for the dilated basic curvelets in polar coordinates:

To construct a basic curvelet with compact support near a ″basic wedge″, the two windows  and need to have compact support.

Then the admissibility yields
see Window Functions for more information

For tiling a circular ring into  wedges, where  is an arbitrary positive integer, we need a -periodic nonnegative window  with support inside  such that
, for all 
 can be simply constructed as -periodizations of a scaled window .

Then, it follows that

For a complete covering of the frequency plane including the region around zero, we need to define a low pass element
  with  

that is supported on the unit circle, and where we do not consider any rotation.

Applications 
 Image Processing
 Seismic Exploration 
 Fluid Mechanics
 PDEs Solving
 Compressed Sensing

See also 
 Shearlet transform
 Bandelet transform
 Contourlet transform 
 Fresnelet transform
 Chirplet transform
 Noiselet transform
 Scale space

References 

E. Candès and D. Donoho, "Curvelets – a surprisingly effective nonadaptive representation for objects with edges." In: A. Cohen, C. Rabut and L. Schumaker, Editors, Curves and Surface Fitting: Saint-Malo 1999, Vanderbilt University Press, Nashville (2000), pp. 105–120.
 Majumdar Angshul Bangla Basic Character Recognition using Digital Curvelet Transform Journal of Pattern Recognition Research (JPRR), Vol 2. (1) 2007 p. 17-26
 Emmanuel Candes, Laurent Demanet, David Donoho and Lexing Ying Fast Discrete Curvelet Transforms
 Jianwei Ma, Gerlind Plonka, The Curvelet Transform: IEEE Signal Processing Magazine, 2010, 27 (2), 118-133. 
 Jean-Luc Starck, Emmanuel J. Candès, and David L. Donoho, The Curvelet Transform for Image Denoising,: IEEE Transactions on Image Processing, Vol. 11, No. 6, June 2002

External links 
Curvelet.org homepage

Image processing
Time–frequency analysis
Wavelets